The M23 is a motorway in the United Kingdom, running from the south of Hooley in Surrey, where it splits from the A23, to Pease Pottage, south of Crawley in West Sussex where it rejoins the A23. The northern end of the motorway starts on what is effectively a  spur north of junction 7 of the M25 motorway (junction 8 on the M23). From Hooley it runs for  past Redhill, Gatwick Airport and Crawley. A spur runs from junction 9 to Gatwick Airport.

History

The motorway was constructed between 1972 and 1975, at the same time as the southern section of the M25 from Godstone to Reigate (M25 junctions 6 to 8). The current northern terminus at junction 7 uses the original sliproads to meet the A23 and a flyover above the junction built for the onward northern continuation remains unused.

The cancellation of the unbuilt northern section from the M25 in towards Central London has resulted in the A23 carrying the majority of traffic through South London to the motorway. This is largely a single carriageway route, with many level junctions, traffic lights and awkward interchanges. It travels largely through residential areas and is inadequate for the level of traffic it carries.

A new junction (J10a) was opened in 1997, between J10 and J11, for access to the new Crawley neighbourhood of Maidenbower. It was financed as part of the development of Maidenbower by the construction consortium. It has only a northbound slip road, no southbound access.

Unbuilt sections

The M23 was planned to relieve congestion on the A23 through Streatham, Thornton Heath, Purley and Coulsdon in south London and was originally intended to terminate in Streatham Vale at a junction with the controversial London Ringways Plan's Ringway 2 (the intended replacement of the South Circular Road (A205)).

In an earlier version of the Ringways Plan it would have continued into central London where it would have met the Balham Loop spur from Ringway 1 (the London Motorway Box) at Tooting. This was dropped in 1967 when the northern terminus was changed to Ringway 2. While a definite route had not been chosen at that time for the northern section, approval was met for the route south of the Greater London boundary at Hooley.

By 1972 the southern section of Ringway 2 had been dropped from the plan, with an alternative proposal that the M23 continue further into London to end on Ringway 1. This was immediately countered in the same year by the GLC, who announced they would not be building that Ringway, which meant that had the M23 continued north into inner London it would not have had the motorway required at its northern end to distribute traffic to the east and west. The M23 plan was gradually scaled back further to omit the section across Mitcham Common and end the motorway at an unsuitable location on Croydon Road (A232) before the plan was postponed indefinitely. By the late 1970s, the area along the proposed line of the motorway had become affected by blight, and while the proposals were finally dropped in the mid-1980s, much of the land reserved for the route was not released by the Department for Transport until the mid-1990s.

The missing section of motorway and the missing six junctions north of Hooley were not constructed due to the refusal of the GLC to finance the project, having encountered large scale opposition to the construction of Ringways elsewhere in London. However, the scale of the four-tier junction between the M23 and the M25, one of only three stack interchanges in the UK, is indicative of the importance attached to the M23 at that time.

Smart motorway 

Between July 2018 and July 2020 works took place to upgrade the M23 between junctions 8 and 10 to an all-lane-running motorway. The upgrades took place mostly for more reliable journeys to Gatwick Airport and increase the overall capacity of the route. The upgrades include an all-lane-running motorway, 12 new emergency areas, a new concrete central barrier replacing the current steel one, new roadside sound barriers, variable speed limits and two new emergency access slip roads. Changes were also implemented on the M23 junction 9 spur, with the hard shoulder west bound converted to a running lane, and static  speed limits implemented in both directions.

In January 2020 all smart motorway projects were put under review due to concerns about their safety, during this period no new smart motorways could open. The review was published on 12 March 2020 and required no immediate amendments to the design or construction, however new technology to detect static vehicles is required to be fitted within three years, and a review on spacing of emergency refuge areas was to be carried out.

The fourth lane was opened to traffic on 2 April 2020, however with a temporary 50 mph speed limit. Works were scheduled to take place until July 2020 to finish installation of equipment, followed by testing and commissioning, before the project is completed and can run at the national speed limit.

Junctions

Data from driver location signs are used to provide distance and carriageway identifier information. Where a junction spans several hundred metres (yards) and start and end points are available, both are cited.

{| style="margin-left:1em; margin-bottom:1em; color:black; font-size:95%;" class="wikitable"
|-  style="background:#0080d0; text-align:center; color:white; font-size:120%;"
| colspan="5" | M23 motorway junctions
|-
!scope=col|miles
!scope=col|km
!scope=col abbr="Northbound"|Northbound exits (B carriageway)
!scope=col|Junction
!scope=col abbr="Southbound"|Southbound exits (A carriageway)
|- align="center"
| 17.0||27.4
| rowspan=2 | Road continues as A23 to CroydonCroydon A23
| rowspan=2 | J7
| rowspan=2 | Crawley, Gatwick A23Non-motorway trafficStart of motorway
|- align="center"
| 17.5||28.2
|- align="center"
| 19.0||30.5
| rowspan=2 | Heathrow Airport, Watford, Dartford Crossing (M4, M1, M20, M11), M25
| rowspan=2 | J8
| rowspan=2 | Heathrow Airport (M4), Stansted Airport (M11) Maidstone (M20) (M3, M40, M26) M25
|- align="center"
| 19.3||31.0
|- align="center"
| 26.5||42.7
| rowspan=2 | Gatwick Airport, Redhill A23
| rowspan=2 | J9
| rowspan=2 | Gatwick Airport, Redhill A23
|- align="center"
| 26.8||43.1
|- align="center"
| 28.5||45.8
| rowspan=2 | Crawley A2011East Grinstead A264
| rowspan=2 | J10
| rowspan=2 | Crawley A2011East Grinstead A264
|- align="center"
| 28.6||46.1
|- align="center"
| 30.3||48.8
| rowspan=2 No exit
| rowspan=2 | J10a
| rowspan=2 | Crawley B2036
|- align="center"
| 30.6||49.2
|- align="center"
| 33.1||53.3
| rowspan=2 | Start of motorwayCrawley A23Non-motorway trafficPease Pottage services
| rowspan=2 | J11Services 
| rowspan=2 | Brighton, Crawley A23Horsham A264Pease Pottage servicesRoad continues as A23 to Brighton
|- align="center"
| 33.4||53.8
|-
|colspan=5|Notes
Distances in kilometres and carriageway identifiers are obtained from driver location signs/location marker posts. Where a junction spans several hundred metres (yards) and the data is available, both the start and finish values for the junction are shown. 
|-

In popular culture
The rivalry between Brighton & Hove Albion and Crystal Palace football clubs is often referred to as the M23 Derby.

See also
List of motorways in the United Kingdom

References

External links

 www.cbrd.co.uk
 Motorway Database – M23
 History of the aborted M23 plan
The Motorway Archive – M23

Motorways in England
Roads in Surrey
Roads in West Sussex
Transport in Crawley